Tapiola is a garden city district named and developed in the 1950s in the suburbs of the city of Espoo, Finland

Tapiola may also refer to:
Tapiola, the land of the forest god Tapio (spirit)
 Tapiola (Sibelius), a 1926 symphonic poem by Jean Sibelius
 Tapiola, Michigan, an unincorporated community in Michigan, USA, founded by Finns
 Tapiola Bank, a Finnish bank 2004-2013
 Tapiola Choir, a choir from Espoo, Finland